Goode Township is one of twelve townships in Franklin County, Illinois, USA.  As of the 2010 census, its population was 2,715 and it contained 1,268 housing units.

Geography

Cities, towns, villages
 Sesser (vast majority)

Unincorporated towns
 Meyer
(This list is based on USGS data and may include former settlements.)

Cemeteries
The township contains these four cemeteries: Bear Point, Maple Hill, Mitchell and Youngblood.

Major highways
  Illinois Route 148
  Illinois Route 154

Demographics

School districts
 Sesser-Valier Community Unit School District 196

Political districts
 Illinois' 12th congressional district
 State House District 117
 State Senate District 59

References
 
 United States Census Bureau 2007 TIGER/Line Shapefiles
 United States National Atlas

External links
 City-Data.com
 Illinois State Archives

Townships in Franklin County, Illinois
Townships in Illinois